Uthukuli is a taluk in Tirupur district in the Indian state of Tamil Nadu.

Demographics
 India census, Uthukuli has a population of 10,130. Males constitute 49.62% of the population and females 50.38%. Uthukuli has an average literacy rate of 68%, higher than the national average of 59.5%: male literacy is 76%, and female literacy is 58%. In Uthukuli, 10% of the population is under 6 years of age.

The name Uthukuli comes from a legend, which tells of Siddha Agasthiyar's arrival at the Kaithamalai temple to meditate. He couldn't find water, so he prayed to Lord Murugan for help. Murugan appeared and created a source of water, which came to be known as Utrukuli and now Uthukuli.

In the earlier days, agriculture was the primary activity with hygienic and sweet water available from the multitude of tanks also called "Kuttai" and "Kulam". There were green pastures and one could see herds of goats, sheep and buffaloes grazing. This aided development of agriculture-based industries like butter making and Uthukuli was known for its famed butter. There were also many rice and paddy-hulling mills facilitating agriculture-based trade. However, the rapid expansion of textile industries in Tiruppur led to installation of many dyeing units and soon, polluted effluents from the textile city of Tiruppur converted the once fertile Noyyal river into a virtual drain. The polluted river and vanishing tanks had dealt a big, still unrecoverable blow to agriculture, dairy farming, rice mills and paddy-hulling in these areas. Consequently, the young and old  of this land are now forced to seek employment opportunities outside this  once scenic spot. Apart from water pollution, scarcity of water and steep rise in labor costs in an unorganized labor sectoras resulted in agriculture taking a back seat and the traditional hereditary farms called "Thottams" are fast vanishing. temple called Vetrivelayutha Swami Temple located in the kathithamalai hill. Mr. N. Saravanamanickam is a famous priest in the temple. 

The taluk is famous for its butter.

With the rapid expansion of nearby towns such as Tiruppur in the west, establishment of industrial parks such as SIPCOT, TAHDCO, "New Tiruppur" al within a short distance and overall growth in trade and commerce, this area is now transforming itself into a service support hub. Agricultural lands are now giving way to accommodate handlooms, spinning mills, stone quarries, mining and poultry farms around this place.

During the recent years, many schools and colleges have opened in the area.

Connectivity

Roadways
Uthukuli is well connected by roads with frequent bus services to Erode and Tiruppur.

Railways
A vital rail link of the Indian Railways runs through Uthukuli making it accessible to other parts of the country.

Worshipping

Temple
Kaithamalai Hill Station is famous for its Sri Kaithamalai Vetrivelautha Swami Murugan Desvasthanam Temple.

The unique feature of Kaithamalai is the Ther procession that attracts many people especially through the surrounding hills, the only place that a procession goes through hills. The 'Ther' festival held in "Thai" maasam is popular.

Then the God is called as "Vetri Velayudha Swami" and the Temple is called "Kaithamalai." With Vetrivelayutha Swamy's Arul and blessings, Mr. Muthusamy Gounder, a farmer has been performing Pooja's and Arul vaakku in Kalasamurugan Temple at Kannaan Kaadu, northern foothills of Kaithamalai for many years. Lord Murugan has incarnated in the temple many years before when one of the Kalasam of the car (Thiru Ther) of Kaithamalai Murugan Temple rolled down to the Northern side of the hill and settled at our thottam during its Car Festival once. Hence the name, Kalasamurugan. People of Uthukuli town and Tirupur used to come and visit this temple near Northern Adivaaram of Kaithamalai.

In the year 2009 Kumbaabishekam has been conducted to the newly built temple and many people attended and received the blessings of Lord Kalasamurgan.

References

Cities and towns in Tiruppur district